According to the Book of Mormon, Ammah was a Nephite missionary from 1st century BC, and a companion to Aaron. Ammah was part of the missionary delegation to the Lamanites that eventually led to the conversion of the Ammonites. He was imprisoned with Aaron during his ministry.

References

Book of Mormon people